The siege of Sangin was a military engagement which occurred between June 2006 and April 2007, between Taliban insurgents and the British Army in Afghanistan. In the engagement the district centre of Sangin District in Helmand Province was occupied by the British forces and was completely surrounded by the Taliban fighters. At one point fighting became intensive, causing General David J. Richards, the NATO commander in Afghanistan, to declare that Helmand province had seen the fiercest fighting involving British troops since the Korean War. It became emblematic of the difficulty of the mission being carried out by British soldiers in Afghanistan, who nicknamed it "Sangingrad" (in reference to the Battle of Stalingrad).

Situation in Sangin 
Sangin, a town of 30,000 inhabitants in Helmand province, is situated in a "green zone", a fertile agricultural area. It is well known for opium production and Taliban activity. The opposition to the Afghan government and to the presence of foreign troops came from a mix of Taliban, local tribesmen and drug traffickers, who were afraid that ISAF troops might destroy their opium poppy crops. Before the British deployment, the area was believed to be under complete Taliban control.

Several incidents involving coalition troops had already occurred in that sector: on June 13, a U.S. convoy was ambushed north of Sangin, on the road to Musa Qala. A Company, 3rd Battalion, Parachute Regiment, were called into the town to protect the convoy, but they withdrew after only 24 hours presence.

In late June, under pressure from President Hamid Karzai, the decision was taken to deploy British troops in Sangin to enforce the authority of the Afghan government. This represented an important change from the "inkspot" strategy that had been carried out previously around Lashkar Gah.

The siege 
A Company was called in to secure Sangin on June 25, 2006 after the Taliban had killed 5 civilians on 18 June, accusing them of working for the government, and a further 27 shortly afterwards when the relatives went to collect the bodies.

The "district centre" (DC), a run-down compound half a mile from the town centre, became a base for some 120 British troops. It also housed the local government offices, and an Afghan police force. The position was strengthened with rudimentary fortifications consisting of foxholes dug round the perimeter and sandbags reinforcing the compound walls.

At first there was no contact with the Taliban, and the attitude of the inhabitants was passive, if not sympathetic to the presence of British troops, who were able to patrol the city safely. The situation changed abruptly on 27 June, after a failed raid by the Special Reconnaissance Regiment, during which two soldiers were killed not far from Sangin.

The attitude of the locals changed suddenly, and the base was attacked soon after with small arms. Taliban attacks increased to five or six a day, including fire from RPG-7 anti-tank rocket launchers. With all roads cut, the district centre was effectively under siege, and wholly dependent on helicopter flights from Camp Bastion for resupply. This was sometimes interrupted for as long as five days, as Taliban fire would have put the helicopters at risk. A unit of Royal Engineers surrounded the whole compound and the helicopter landing pad with a double rampart of Hesco barriers, despite Taliban fire.

On 1 July, two signallers, Corporal Peter Thorpe and Lance Corporal Jabron Hashmi, and an Afghan interpreter, who were listening in to Taliban communications, were killed when a Chinese-made 107mm rocket hit the district centre. Hashmi was the first British Muslim soldier to die during the War on Terror.

Each attack was repulsed, as British troops posted on the DC rooftop directed fire from artillery, mortars and airstrikes from attack helicopters and jets against the Taliban, inflicting heavy losses. The situation worsened when the Afghan policemen began defecting to the Taliban, giving them inside information about the layout of the base.

Operation Mountain Thrust 
On 16 July, during Operation Mountain Thrust, 200 British paratroops, supported by AgustaWestland Apache attack helicopters, were inserted by Boeing Chinook heavy transport helicopters into Sangin. In a concerted attack with the troops stationed there, they were able to break the siege of the District Centre. They were supported by 700 coalition troops, including American, Canadian, Afghan and Estonian forces. In a cordon and search operation, the town was sealed off and Taliban compounds were searched and cleared. Ten Taliban were confirmed killed during this operation, and the others were driven out. The operation weakened the Taliban hold on the city, but did not break it, and the district centre was soon under attack again.

Continued fighting 
On 20 August, a 20-man group of paratroopers was clearing a compound when they were ambushed by the Taliban. A section led by Corporal Bryan Budd counterattacked and Budd himself killed two enemy fighters, but the section was forced to withdraw under heavy fire, with two men injured. It was only later that the platoon commander realized that Budd was missing, but rescuing him proved impossible due to heavy fire from the Taliban. The company commander, Major Jamie Loden, organised a relief force, cobbled together from various units, including elements of the Royal Engineers and two Royal Military Policemen who happened to be in Sangin. Supported by the fire of two Apache helicopters, the British finally rescued Budd an hour after he had been hit, but it was too late to save him, and he died of his injuries. For his bravery during this action, Corporal Budd was posthumously awarded the Victoria Cross, the highest distinction in the British armed forces.

The paratroopers were later replaced by 3 Commando Brigade, initially with Kilo Company 42 Commando Royal Marines, then C Company 2nd Battalion The Light Infantry (later 3 Rifles). After a relativity quiet tenure Lima Company 42 Commando took up the mantle for a brief time before handing over to  C Company 2nd Battalion, Royal Regiment of Fusiliers

A vicious spike in the violence took place with 29th Commando Regiment Royal Artillery's Fire Support Teams, (then providing fire support to the infantry) sustaining three killed in action in less than a week. Mike Company's short but bloody tenure saw them relieved in March 2007 by C Company Group, 2nd Battalion, Royal Regiment of Fusiliers. In their first twenty days in Sangin, the fusiliers were attacked 79 times.

Relief of Sangin 

In April 2007, more than 1,000 international forces took part in Operation Silver, with the objective of relieving Sangin. NATO gave advance warning of the coming assault by dropping leaflets, and through the town elders, who were charged with spreading the word.

U.S. troops from 1st Battalion, 508th Parachute Infantry Regiment, 82nd Airborne Division launched a heliborne assault at various locations approximately 5 kilometres south of the district centre. Augmented with elements of the Afghan National Army, 1-508 assaulted north and pursued enemy forces to positions north and east of the district centre. Simultaneously, a column of armoured transports with 250 Royal Marines from 42 Commando attacked from the north. Danish and Estonian soldiers also participated, and fire-support was provided by Dutch and American aircraft, and by Canadian artillery.

On 5 April, coalition troops occupied Sangin, meeting only light resistance, as the town had been mostly vacated by the Taliban, and abandoned by most of its inhabitants. Though Taliban groups still operated in surrounding areas, the Afghan civil authorities were able to return, marking the end of the siege. The governor of Helmand province appointed a new local governor, and a permanent ANA base was established in the town.

References

External links 
 

Military operations of the War in Afghanistan (2001–2021)
Conflicts in 2006
Conflicts in 2007
2006 in Afghanistan
2007 in Afghanistan
History of Helmand Province
NATO operations in Afghanistan
Military operations of the War in Afghanistan (2001–2021) involving the United Kingdom
Military operations of the War in Afghanistan (2001–2021) involving Canada
Military operations of the War in Afghanistan (2001–2021) involving Denmark
Military operations of the War in Afghanistan (2001–2021) involving Estonia
Military operations of the War in Afghanistan (2001–2021) involving the United States
Military operations of the War in Afghanistan (2001–2021) involving the Netherlands
Sieges involving the United Kingdom